St. John the Baptist Roman Catholic Church may refer to:

 St. John the Baptist Roman Catholic Church (Newark, Delaware)
 St. John the Baptist Roman Catholic Church (Wilder, Kentucky)
 St. John the Baptist Roman Catholic Church (Glandorf, Ohio)
 St. John the Baptist Roman Catholic Church, Manayunk Philadelphia, PA